Gapjangsan is a mountain of Gyeongsangbuk-do, eastern South Korea. It has an elevation of 806 metres.

See also
List of mountains of Korea

References

Sangju
Mountains of North Gyeongsang Province
Mountains of South Korea